The Internet Link protocol or IL is a connection-based transport-layer protocol designed at Bell Labs originally as part of the Plan 9 operating system and is used to carry 9P. It is assigned the Internet Protocol number of 40. It is similar to TCP but much simpler.

Its main features are:
 Reliable datagram service
 In-sequence delivery
 Internetworking using IP
 Low complexity, high performance
 Adaptive timeouts

As of the Fourth Edition of Plan 9, 2003, IL is deprecated in favor of TCP/IP because it doesn't handle long-distance connections well.

See also 
 Fast Local Internet Protocol

References

Further reading 
 —The original paper describing IL

Inferno (operating system)
Internet Protocol based network software
Network protocols
Plan 9 from Bell Labs
Transport layer protocols